The William W. Ker was a 19th-century Pennsylvania pilot schooner built in 1889 in Wilmington, Delaware. She was designed by Edward Burgess for the Pennsylvania pilots and was built for speed. She was a favorite with the pilots and was considered the fastest pilot boat on the coast. The Ker was hit and sank by a steamer off the Five Fathom Bank in 1900.

Construction and service 

The two-masted pilot schooner W. W. Ker was launched on November 27, 1889, from the Jackson & Sharp Company at Wilmington, Delaware for the Pennsylvania pilots. She was designed by Edward Burgess and took the place of the Enoch Turley, which was lost with all on board in the April 6, 1889 storm.

The W. W. Ker was named in honor of the Assistant District Attorney of Philadelphia Captain William W. Ker, under George Scott Graham.

Pilot James R. Kelley from the Turley was present at the launch. A bottle of champagne was broken on her bow by Mary Conner, a granddaughter of pilot George H. Conner. As she broke the bottle she said: "I christen thee W. W. Ker." Her dimensions were 88 ft. in length; 22 ft. breadth of beam; 9 ft. depth of hold; 72 ft. mainmast and 64 ft. foremast. She was built for speed.

By August 1893, the Committee on Navigation and Pilots of the Board of Port Wardens recognized only four pilot boats for the Port of Philadelphia, the E. C. Knight, John G. Whilldin, W. W. Ker and J. Henry Edmunds.

On 19 Mar 1897, the William W. Ker and the John G. Whilldin cruised near the  Fenwick Island Light vessel, waiting to board ships coming from the Caribbean. She was a favorite with the pilots and was considered the fastest pilot boat on the coast.

End of service

On February 18, 1898, due to the introduction of steam service at the Delaware Breakwater, the schooner William W. Ker was bought from the Philadelphia pilots to Captain Redman for mackerel fishing. The Ker would often fish on the banks off Cape Henlopen.

On June 27, 1900, she was hit and sank by a steamer off the Five Fathom Bank by one of the old Dominion Line, the Hamilton steamers bound from New York to Norfolk, Virginia. Captain Redmond of New York was in command of the Ker when she went down. Sixteen men were rescued and taken to Norfolk.

See also
List of Pennsylvania Pilot boats
Pilots' Association For The Bay & River Delaware

External links
 Lewes Historical Society

References 

 

   

Individual sailing vessels
Service vessels of the United States
Schooners of the United States
Ships built in Wilmington, Delaware
1889 ships
Pilot boats